Umar Bin Mohammad Daudpota (25 March 1896 – 22 November 1958) was a researcher, historian, linguist and scholar of the Indus Valley.

Life
Daudpota was born on 25 March 1896 at Talti, Dadu District. His family was poor. His father, Mohammad Daudpota, was a farmer and Carpenter. His primary education was in his hometown. For secondary education, he went to Larkana in 1914 and later to the Madressah school of Naushahro Feroze. Eventually, he matriculated from Sindh-Madrasa-tul-Islam in Karachi. He got first position in 1917. After passing his Matriculation, he went to D. J. Science College, Sindh at Karachi, where he received his BA and MA degrees. Government of India awarded him a scholarship for higher studies at Cambridge University where he received his Ph.D. degree.

In 1927, he wrote his doctoral thesis entitled "The effect of Arabic Poetry on Persian Poetry" and received the degree of Ph.D. After completion of his doctoral degree, he returned to his homeland in 1927 and was appointed as Principal of Sindh-Madrasa-tul-Islam. Later on, he joined Ismail Yusuf College, Bombay as professor of Arabic. He worked there for nine years. He was appointed Director of Public Instruction in Sindh in 1939 taking over from Khan Bahadur Ghulam Nabi Kazi. He was given the honorary title of Shams-ul-Ulama ("Sun of the Scholars") from the British Government in 1940.

He was a member of the Pakistan Public Service Commission from 1950 to 1955. He performed Hajj in 1955. He served as superior (care taker) of Quarterly Mehran in 1957.

Daudpota was the father of the famous Air Marshall Azim Daudpota who also was a Governor of Sindh and a former chairman of Pakistan International Airlines.

Daudpota did his scholarly research in English, Arabic, Persian, and Sindhi. His fields of research included history, poetry, criticism, biography, religion and Sindhi literature. He wrote more than two dozens books and a number of columns and essays.

Death
Daudpota died on 22 November 1958 at Karachi. His last resting place is at the Shrine of Shah Abdul Latif Bhittai at Bhitshah, Sindh, Pakistan.

Bibliography
 Maro je Malir Ja by Khadim Hussain Chandio
 A Sindhi Scholar, by Muhammad Umar Chand
 Mangrio
 The Chachnama (Persian Text) - Edited by Umar Bin Muhammad Daudpota
 Murshid-ul-Mubtada (Arabic reader for students)
 Minhaj-ul-Ashqeen ("The Path of the Lovers")
 Shah Abdul Karim Bulri Wari Jo Kalam Abdul Raheem Grohiri Jo Kalam Abyat-e-Sindhi (Verses of Muhammad Zaman Luwaree Shareef)
 Munhnji Mukhtasir Aatam Kahani ("My short autobiography")
 Surha Gul ("Perfumed Flowers")
 Hindustan Mein Aam Taleem ("Mass Education in India")
 Sindhi Nazam Choonda Sindhi Nasar Ain Nazam Bayan-ul-Arfeen (A short version of Malfoodhaat of Shah Abdul Kareem of Bulri)
 Selection from Hafiz and Arif (English)
 Tarikh-i-Masumi'' written by Mir Masum Shah, edited by Umar Bin Muhammad Daudpota (1938)

See also
 Allama I. I. Kazi
 Mirza Kalich Baig
 Khan Bahadur Ghulam Nabi Kazi
 Nabi Bux Khan Baloch
 Muhammad Ibrahim Joyo
 Sindh-Madrasa-tul-Islam

References

1896 births
1958 deaths
Sindhi people
D. J. Sindh Government Science College alumni
Pakistani writers
People from British India
Sindhi-language writers
Academics from Karachi
Writers from Karachi
University of Mumbai alumni
Sindh Madressatul Islam University alumni
Scholars from Sindh
Pakistani scholars